Maritime Venice or Byzantine Venice refers to a territory of the Byzantine Empire framed in the Exarchate of Italy and corresponding to the coastal belt of ancient Venetia, on the coast of present-day Veneto and Friuli-Venezia Giulia. This is distinct from the hinterland of the Euganean Venice which passed from the end of the sixth century under the control of the Lombards.

The territory was a vast peripheral area of the Byzantine domains in Italy, characterized by scattered settlements without major urban centers. The precarious geographical conditions favored new social and economic models, stemming from the traditional Roman lagoon activities such as fishing, glass processing, and salt extraction. Having escaped the Barbarian Invasions, the local population also developed commerce considerably. This occurred thanks to the protection guaranteed by the complex system of canals and islands, as well as the tax privileges enjoyed by the Byzantine provinces in Italy. The distance from Byzantium and political controversies due to the Tricapitolino schism initially caused the emergence of two competing factions, broadly aligned to the Lombards and the Byzantines, until the autonomy granted by Byzantine emperors was consolidated. The Ducatus Venetiae was formed between the end of the seventh century and the beginnings of the eighth.

Territory and settlements 

Venetia Maritima emerged as a result of the Lombard occupation of a large part of the current Veneto region and the progressive migration of Roman populations. These Romans came from the fall of Aquileia, leading to new coastal settlements, protected by the lagoons and the imperial fleet. The Romans who migrated from mainland Venetia to build new settlements in the islands of the Adriatic coast did not abandon their region, thinking one day they'd be able to return to regain their lost cities. A similar process took place in Istria and, a few decades later, in Dalmatia following the invasion of the Avars and part of the Veneto hinterland between the rivers Adige and Brenta.

Giovanni Diacono, writing shortly after the year 1000, described the province:

Economy 
Data on the economic situation of Venetia Maritima were collected thanks to a series of studies carried out on the archaeological excavations of Torcello in the mid-1950s. From the Roman age to the early Middle Ages the territory of the lagoon was used mainly, if not exclusively, for the production of salt or for other minor activities related to fishing and dredging of the coast. Navigation was already important at the time of the reign of the Gothic Vitige, whose minister Cassiodorus thus addressed the Venetians:

The Roman economic system held up until the beginning of Byzantine rule, and until then the unity of the province was maintained. At the time of Narsete, the various arts already met in guilds, called scholae, protected by a patron: this included the arts of blacksmiths, centonars, fulli, merchants, shopkeepers, stonemasons, potters, painters, etc.

The forced increase of the population due to the migrations from Veneto led to a radical change in the economic production of the area, which from the periphery became a real market. Since the Lombard invasion, a fairly substantial agricultural production was activated, including export products such as pine nuts, walnuts, hazelnuts, peaches and plums, as well as vines and cucumbers, in a local variety still present in Torcello. The growth of the population then led to a second transformation of the territory which, becoming a city area, saw the demand for artisanal products grow. This caused the development of the ceramic industry and finally the glass art (as early as 639 in the church of Torcello the first mosaics appeared with glass tesserae). Torcello was about to become a real commercial center, a «μέγαν ἐμπόριον» (megan emporion, "large market") already in the time of Costantino Porfirogenito. Only the building technique remained the same as the mainland, both in construction materials and in the most common artisan productions, which also felt the influence of the Lombard models.

The development of mercantilism 
Venetian commercial activities had always naturally taken place between the Po-Veneto plain and the vast stretch of coast that reaches Ravenna from Trieste (in a broader sense also Istria). In fact, these areas were crossed by the Annia and Postumia streets and by the network of rivers and navigable canals guaranteed by the lagoon system. This merchant bond, despite various conflicts, continued uninterrupted until the eighth century. This ended when Adriano I confiscated the Venetian possessions in the territories of the archdiocese of Ravenna, after political conflicts in Italy, and banished the lagoon merchants of the Exarchate, the Venetian economy that until then had been controlled by the landowners and directed by their financial needs. The Exarchate was forced to radically renew its productive system, witnessing the intervention of new members of society or old agrarians who became shipowners, aimed mainly at maritime trade. The privileged political relations with the east also allowed the local population to gain monopoly areas, such as the trade of the so-called Tyrian purples, leather or Asian fabrics, as well as the slave market which was conducted for several centuries by the Venetians between the Slavic world and Islamic Africa. The military fleet was greatly encouraged, both by private individuals and by the local government, already from the early days of patrolling the whole Adriatic from Istria to Otranto, against piracy, reinforced by powerful ships built on the model of the Byzantine imperial dromon, called zalandriae.

References

Provinces of the Byzantine Empire
Exarchate of Ravenna
History of Venice